BELMA is a Polish defence company located in Białe Błota. It is one of the oldest industrial plants in Poland.

History

Belma’s business began in 1868 as a locksmith company. The company specialized in devices for the railroad mining and defense industries, expanding to include motor vehicles and other industrial services. Its primary responsibility today is production and design  of land mines (according to Ottawa Treaty - only anti-tank mines can be produced) for the Polish Army. BELMA is the only manufacturer of anti-tank mines in Poland. 
 
Since 2010, BELMA has been a member of Division Ammunition of BUMAR GROUP.

References

External links
Official Website
Poland major companies - google books
BZE Belma unveils manually laid Kroton-R anti-tank mine
landmine.de
Polish Defense Holding

Defence companies of Poland
Polish brands
Bydgoszcz County
1868 establishments in Prussia
Companies established in 1868
Companies based in Bydgoszcz